The UIC Flames men's ice hockey was an NCAA Division I ice hockey team that played in the CCHA for most of their 15-year tenure.

History
Illinois–Chicago began sponsoring men's ice hockey in 1966 and stayed with the lesser-classified teams when the NCAA created the tier system in the 1970s. After fifteen years in the second tier the Flames jumped to Division I, playing as an independent for one season before joining the CCHA for the 1982–83 season. With their new coach Val Belmonte the team had difficulty competing in a major conference in the early years, finishing dead last in the CCHA their first two seasons. By 1984–85 the Flames had climbed into the middle of the conference standings aided by top 10 scorer (and future NHLer) Ray Staszak, and their all-time leading defenseman Darin Banister. Two years later the Flames produced their first winning season, going 21–17–1 and winning their first postseason game (though they still couldn't get out of the conference quarterfinals). UIC finally managed to get into the CCHA semifinals in 1989 but after a dreadful season the following year Belmonte was out as coach.

Larry Pedrie was brought in as the head coach and while the Flames saw a slight improvement in his first season UIC would remain a bottom-feeder for the duration of his tenure. The Flames had a sub-.400 record every season over the next six years and, though they would make the CCHA tournament every year from 1991 through '95, they went 1–10 in tournament play, never making it out of the opening round.  When the 1995–96 season rolled around the Flames were seven years removed from a winning season and virtually irrelevant in college hockey circles. More importantly the program had lost the university around $600,000 the year before and UIC did not have another major program to balance out the books. With the administration believing basketball to be a better investment the ice hockey program was discontinued after the season.

UIC Hockey was broadcast from 1983-84 through the final season of 1995-96 with Les Grobstein handing play by play. Chris Madsen and John Kelley filled in when Grobstein had a conflict with UIC Basketball.

The Flames would return to the ice in 2004 as a club team but as of 2017 the Chicago-area and the entire state of Illinois has been left without a Division I program since the flames went belly-up.

Season-by-season records
Source:

All-time coaching records

Flames in the NHL

Source:

References

External links
Year by year record

 
Ice hockey clubs established in 1966
Sports clubs disestablished in 1996